Patrinia gibbosa, the swollen patrinia, is a species of flowering plant in the family Caprifoliaceae, native to northern Japan and the Kuril Islands. A clumping perennial, it is smaller than the better-known Patrinia scabiosifolia.

References

Valerianoideae
Garden plants of Asia
Flora of Japan
Flora of the Kuril Islands
Plants described in 1868